Covers All is a cover album of the Finnish heavy metal band Waltari, recorded on the 25th anniversary of Waltari. This cover album was released in 2011 by Stupido Records label.

Track listing
 P.L.U.C.K. (System Of A Down cover)
 Give it to Me (Madonna cover)
 The Dead Heart (Midnight Oil cover)
 Duke (Dingo cover)
 Look back in Anger (David Bowie cover)
 Caught in a Mosh (Anthrax cover)
 Plastic Ships (Hassisen Kone cover)
 One Hundred Years (The Cure cover) 
 Infinite Dreams (Iron Maiden cover)
 A Saucerful of Secrets (Pink Floyd cover)
 A Forest (acoustic version; The Cure cover) (Hidden track)

Credits
 Kartsy Hatakka (vocals, bass, programming)
 Jari Lehtinen (guitar)
 Sami Yli-Sirnio (guitar)
 Ville Vehvilainen (drums)
 Janne Immonen (keyboards, programming)

Waltari albums
2011 albums
Covers albums